Mu-Kien Adriana Sang Ben (born 8 September 1955) is a historian, essayist, analyst, political scientist and academic from the Dominican Republic. Sang is Vice-Rector of the Madre y Maestra Pontifical Catholic University.

The daughter of a Cantonese immigrant man, and a Dominican-born woman whose father was a Chinese immigrant and her mother was Mulatto (of African and European descent). Sang has a degree in Teaching Summa Cum Laude in the Pontificia Universidad Católica Madre y Maestra, where she has taught for more than two decades. She did her graduate degree in Adult Education in the Centro de Cooperación Regional para la Educación de Adultos de América Latina y el Caribe (CREFAL) in 1978, in Mexico City. In 1985 she achieved his PhD in History and Civilization at the School for Advanced Studies in the Social Sciences in Paris. She translated from French to Spanish the work Correspondence of the Consul of France in Santo Domingo, published in two volumes under the sponsorship of the official Sesquicentennial Commission of National Independence. She has been a guest professor and public speaker at several universities in different nations.

In 2006, a street was named in her honor at the Plaza of Culture Juan Pablo Duarte, host of the International Book Fair of Santo Domingo.

Her husband, Rafael Toribio, has been rector of the Santo Domingo Institute of Technology (INTEC).

Notes and references

External links 
 Articles written by Mu-Kien Adriana Sang on El Caribe
 Biography of Mu-Kien Adriana Sang on Dominicana Academy of History
 Biography of Mu-Kien Adriana Sang on Escritores Dominicanos
 Mu-Kien Sang Ben dona su biblioteca a la PUCMM
 Feria del Libro 2006: Galería de Escritores Homenajeados

Living people
1955 births
Dominican Republic people of Chinese descent
 
 
Dominican Republic women writers
Dominican Republic essayists
Women essayists
20th-century Dominican Republic historians
People from Santiago de los Caballeros
Dominican Republic women academics
Pontificia Universidad Católica Madre y Maestra people
Academic staff of the Pontificia Universidad Católica Madre y Maestra
Pontificia Universidad Católica Madre y Maestra alumni
Dominican Republic women historians
21st-century Dominican Republic historians